Moira is a civil parish in County Down, Northern Ireland. It is mainly situated in the historic baronies of Iveagh Lower, Upper Half, with one townland in the barony of Iveagh Upper, Upper Half.

Settlements
The civil parish contains the following settlements:
Moira
Lurganville

Townlands
Magheralin civil parish contains the following townlands:

Aughnadrumman
Aughnafosker
Balloonigan
Ballycanal
Ballygowan
Ballyknock
Ballymagaraghan
Bottier
Carnalbanagh East
Carnalbanagh West
Clare
Derrydrummult
Drumbane
Gortnamony
Kilminioge
Legmore
Lurganville
Magherahinch
Risk
Tullyard
Tullyloob

See also
List of civil parishes of County Down

References